1919 in philosophy

Events

Births 
 March 18 - G. E. M. Anscombe (died 2001)
 March 21 - R. M. Hare (died 2002)
 May 31 - Huston Smith (died 2016)
 July 15 - Iris Murdoch (died 1999)
 July 26 - James Lovelock 
 September 13 - Mary Midgley (died 2018)
 September 21 - Mario Bunge (died 2020)
 November 23 - P. F. Strawson (died 2006)
 November 29 - Frank Kermode (died 2010)
 December 6 - Paul de Man (died 1983)

Deaths 
 January 15 - Rosa Luxemburg (born 1871)
 August 9 - Ernst Haeckel (born 1834)

References 

Philosophy
20th-century philosophy
Philosophy by year